Eboni Deon is an on-camera meteorologist for WSB-TV in Atlanta Georgia.

History
Prior to her current position, Deon was a meteorologist for WFTV-TV in Orlando and prior to that The Weather Channel, she has also been a radio broadcast meteorologist for the Weather Channel Radio Network. Before coming to the Weather Channel, Deon was a broadcast meteorologist at the National Weather Networks in Jackson, Mississippi.

She also spent time doing weather reports for CNN International. In 2013 she began doing the weather on Al Jazeera America on weekends and part-time in the morning as a fill in for chief meteorologist Nichole Mitchell when she was on reserve duty. On December, 9th 2014, it was announced that Deon had joined WISH-TV in her hometown of Indianapolis as the weekend evening meteorologist. She returned to WFTV-TV in January 2017.

Personal
Deon is originally from Indianapolis, Indiana. She attended Jackson State University in Jackson, Mississippi, where she graduated with a Bachelor of Science degree in Meteorology. She is married with 3 children.

References

External links 

Living people
People from Indianapolis
Al Jazeera people
CNN people
American television meteorologists
Year of birth missing (living people)